Ciro Cappellari is film director, cinematographer, and screenwriter based in Berlin, Germany.

Early life and career
Born in Buenos Aires, Argentina in 1959, he grew up in a small town in Patagonia, Ingeniero Jacobacci.  Later when he was 10 his family moved to San Carlos de Bariloche.

In Europe
In 1980 Cappellari came to Europe first to Italy and then later Munich where he found work as a photo journalist with the agency Interfoto where he took portraits of public figures for newspapers in Germany and throughout Europe.  He then went to Berlin in 1984 to begin his studies at the Deutsche Film- und Fernsehakademie Berlin(DFFB). In 1989 Cappellari realized his first full-length film Amor América a documentary and two years later in 1991 he realized his first feature film Hijo del Río. After this period he continued writing and directing several films such as Sin Querer –Time of the Flamingos (1997) and the documentary about the famous South African pianist Abdullah Ibrahim, A Struggle For Love (2004). Through his experience in photography he also became a well known cinematographer.

Awards
Ciro has won several awards including the best European screenplay for 100 years of Cinema at the Sundance Film Festival, Cinema 100 Award for  Sin Querer,  Tiempo de Flamencos in 1996 and in 2005 he received the Grimme-Preis in Germany for directing, and cinematography for A Struggle For Love.  Films that Cappellari was involved in as director of photography also won several prizes including: Die Blaue Stunde, the Max Opühls Prize in 1992, Schwarzfahrer which won the short film Oscar in 1994 and Mein name ist Bach, the best Swiss film in 2007.

Filmography

Writer/director (selection)
The Street And The Rag Ball (2012)
Francesco e il Papa (2011)
In Berlin (2009)
24h Buenos Aires (2008)
Bridging the Gap  (2007)
Gens d’Europe - Zambeze  (2006)
Audienz beim Kaiser   (2005)
Welcome Home   (2005)
A Struggle For Love  (2004)
Sin Querer –Tiempo de flamencos (1996)
Hijo del Río (1991)
Amor América (1989)

T.V.  movies as director
Sehnsucht   (2005)
Tatort - Endspiel  (2002)

Director of Photography (selection)
Das Haus der schlafenden Schönen (2006)
Maux d’amour (2005)
Les Champions d’Olympie (2004)
The Fight (2004)
Mein Name ist Bach (2003)
Semana Santa (2001)
Mörderinnen (2000)
El acordeón del diablo (2000)
Voyage Oriental (2000)
Giora Feidmann Porträt (2000)
Last Minute Casbah (1999)
Aprilkinder (1997)
Vampsida (1997)
Magic Matterhorn (1995)
Indians Never die(1995)
Marmor, Stein und Eisen (1994)
Die Bettkönnigin (1994)
Joe et Marie (1994)
Surabaya Jonny (1993)
Cripple to be Free (1993)
Am Ende der Nacht (1992)
Vaterland (1992)
Schwarzfahrer (1992)
Die blaue Stunde (1992)
Hinter verschlossenen Türen (1992)
Praktisch und Friedlich (1992)
Georgette Meunier (1988)
Der Pannwitz-Blick (1987)
WalkWoman (1987)
Habibi - ein Liebesbrief (1985)
Nihil- oder alle Zeit der Welt (1985)

References

External links
https://web.archive.org/web/20140719064739/http://cirocappellari.com/

Argentine film directors
Mass media people from Berlin
1959 births
Living people
People from Bariloche
Argentine emigrants to Germany